is a former Japanese football player.

Playing career
Takahashi was born in Yamagata Prefecture on June 5, 1970. After graduating from Kokushikan University, he joined newly was promoted to Japan Football League club, NEC Yamagata (later Montedio Yamagata) in 1994. He became a regular player from first season and played many matches for a long time. The club was promoted to new league J2 League from 1999. He played for the club in 13 seasons and retired end of 2006 season.

Club statistics

References

External links

1970 births
Living people
Kokushikan University alumni
Association football people from Yamagata Prefecture
Japanese footballers
J2 League players
Japan Football League (1992–1998) players
Montedio Yamagata players
Association football midfielders